Inna Simonova (born  in Oral) is a Kazakhstani short-track speed-skater. Simonova competed at the 2014 Winter Olympics representing Kazakhstan. In the 500 metres she came in fourth in her heat, in the 1000 metres she was third in her heat, and in the 1500 metres, she finishing fourth in her heat. Her best individual finish was in the 1000m, where she was 21st.

As of September 2014, Simonova's best performance at the World Championships came in 2014, when she finished 17th in the 1000m.

As of September 2014, Simonova's top World Cup ranking is 35th, in the 1500 metres in 2013–14.

References 

1990 births
Living people
Kazakhstani female short track speed skaters
Olympic short track speed skaters of Kazakhstan
Short track speed skaters at the 2014 Winter Olympics
Asian Games medalists in short track speed skating
Short track speed skaters at the 2007 Asian Winter Games
Short track speed skaters at the 2011 Asian Winter Games
Medalists at the 2011 Asian Winter Games
Asian Games bronze medalists for Kazakhstan
People from West Kazakhstan Region
21st-century Kazakhstani women